"Goin' Home" is a song written by Alan Osmond, Merrill Osmond, and Wayne Osmond and performed by The Osmonds.  It reached #4 on the UK Singles Chart, #30 on the Canadian pop chart, #36 on the Billboard chart, and #91 on Canadian adult contemporary chart in 1973.  It was featured on their 1973 album, The Plan.

The song was produced by Alan Osmond. It followed the same basic arrangement as their previous string of rock hits and, like the other songs on The Plan, carried a Mormon undertone ("going home" being a euphemism for heaven, and one point mentioning being a space traveler in a veiled reference to Kolob).

Certifications

References

1973 songs
1973 singles
The Osmonds songs
MGM Records singles
Songs written by Alan Osmond
Songs written by Merrill Osmond
Songs written by Wayne Osmond